IBAN or Iban or Ibán may refer to:

Banking
 International Bank Account Number

Ethnology
 Iban culture
 Iban language
 Iban people

Given name

Cycling
 Iban Iriondo (born 1984)
 Iban Mayo (born 1977)
 Iban Mayoz (born 1981)

Football
 Ibán Espadas (born 1978)
 Ibán Parra (born 1977)
 Iban Zubiaurre (born 1983)
 Playing name of Iván Salvador (born 1995)

Volleyball
 Ibán Pérez (born 1983)

See also
 Ban number

Language and nationality disambiguation pages